Agrotis talda is a moth of the family Noctuidae described by William Schaus and W. G. Clements in 1893. It is found in Sierra Leone.

References

Agrotis
Moths of Africa
Moths described in 1893